Henry McPetrie (14 March 1877 – 1 November 1937) was a former Australian rules footballer who played with Carlton in the Victorian Football League (VFL).

Notes

External links 
		
Henry McPetrie's profile at Blueseum

1877 births
VFL/AFL players born outside Australia
Australian rules footballers from Victoria (Australia)
Carlton Football Club players
Scottish emigrants to Australia
1937 deaths